The following is a list of mayors of the city of Poltava, Ukraine. It includes positions equivalent to mayor, such as chairperson of the city council executive committee.

Mayors

Russian empire
 Jacob Kishchenko (Яків Кищенко), 1800-1802
 Ilya Prokofiev (Ілля Прокоф'єв), 1802-1805
 Yakov Lokoshchenko (Яків Локощенко), 1805-1808
 Ilya Prokofiev (Ілля Прокоф'єв), 1808-1811
 Mykola Cherkasov (Микола Черкасов), 1811-1814
 Ivan Mikhailovsky (Іван Михайловський), 1814-1818
 Ilya Prokofiev (Ілля Прокоф'єв), 1818-1819
 Abraham of Green (Авраам Зеленський), 1819-1822
 Pavlo Chubenko (Павло Чубенко), 1822-1829
 Peter Vorozheykin (Петро Ворожейкін), 1829-1832
 Andriy Panasenko (Андрій Панасенко), 1832-1835
 Stepan Komar (Степан Комар), 1835-1838
 Stepan Medvedev (Степан Медведєв), 1838-1841
 Peter Vorozheykin (Петро Ворожейкін), 1841-1843
 Semyon Belyaev (Семен Бєляєв), 1843-1850
 Stepan Komar (Степан Комар), 1850-1852
 Mykola Vakulenko (Микола Вакуленко), 1852-1855
 Ivan Tengeleev (Іван Тенгелєєв), 1855-1864
 Stepan Panasenko (Степан Панасенко), 1864-1868
  (Семен Кованько), 1868-1871
  (Олександр Абаза), 1871-1888
  (Віктор Трегубов), 1888-1906
 Petro Kulyabko-Koretsky (Петро Кулябко-Корецький), 1906-1908
 Alexander Chernenko (Олександр Черненко), 1908-1913
 Sergey Zankovsky (Сергій Заньковський), 1913-1917
 Sergey Semenchenko (Сергій Семенченко), 1917

Ukraine
 Anatoliy Kukoba, 1990-2006
  (Матковський Андрій Всеволодович), 2006-2011 
  (Мамай Олександр Федорович), 2011–2018, 2020-
  (Шамота Олександр Сергійович), 2018-2020

See also
 Timeline of Poltava
 Poltava history
 History of Poltava (in Ukrainian)

References

This article incorporates information from the Ukrainian Wikipedia.

History of Poltava Oblast
Poltava